Bishak Tappeh may refer to:
 Bishak Tappeh, Gonbad-e Qabus, Golestan Province
 Bishak Tappeh, Maraveh Tappeh, Golestan Province
 Bishak Tappeh, Kermanshah